Vigneux is the name or part of the name of three communes of France:
Vigneux-de-Bretagne in the Loire-Atlantique département
Vigneux-Hocquet in the Aisne département
Vigneux-sur-Seine in the Essonne département